Khouloud Hlimi (born 5 February 1990) is a Tunisian boxer. She competed in the women's featherweight event at the 2020 Summer Olympics.

References

External links
 

1990 births
Living people
Tunisian women boxers
Olympic boxers of Tunisia
Boxers at the 2020 Summer Olympics
Place of birth missing (living people)
African Games medalists in boxing
African Games gold medalists for Tunisia
Competitors at the 2019 African Games
20th-century Tunisian women
21st-century Tunisian women